Philip Wharton may refer to:

Philip Wharton, 3rd Baron Wharton (1555–1625), English nobleman
Philip Wharton, 4th Baron Wharton (1613–1696), English nobleman and parliamentarian
Philip Wharton, 1st Duke of Wharton (1698–1731), English nobleman, Jacobite politician
Philip Fishbourne Wharton (1841–1880), American artist